Basic Education High School No.5 Tarmwe (commonly known as Tarmwe 5 High School) is a public high school in Tamwe Township, Yangon City. It used to be a Christian school when Burma was a British colony. Even before the school was nationalized, It has been a boys' school since establishment. The high school was formerly known as St. Francis Boys' School, and is located still to this day beside St. Francis of Assisi Catholic Church, Yangon. Next to the church is Basic Education High School No. 4 Tarmwe, which was once also a Christian school.

References

High schools in Yangon